Yukta Inderlal Mookhey is an Indian civic activist and the winner of Miss World 1999. She is the fourth Indian woman to win Miss World and was previously crowned as Femina Miss India World in 1999. She is a former model and actress, and has worked in Hindi films.

Early life
Mookhey was born in Bangalore in a Sindhi family and was raised in Dubai until Mookhey was seven years of age. Her family moved back to Mumbai in June 1986. Her mother Aroona used to run a grooming saloon in Santa Cruz, Mumbai and her father, Inderlal Mookhey was a former Managing Director of a clothing company. After school, she studied zoology at the V. G. Vaze College in Mumbai. She has a diploma in computer sciences from Aptech and has studied Hindustani classical music for three years.

Pageantry

Femina Miss India
In 1999, Mookhey entered herself into the Femina Miss India contest, where she was shortlisted as a contestant. In the semifinal round during the grand finale, she was asked a question from the judge Viv Richards - “How do you define a true sports person?”, to which she answered:

Mookhey proceeded to the succeeding round, where all her fellow Top 5 delegates were asked the same question - “In the context of the recent controversy, if you were Chelsea Clinton, what is the single most important advice, you as a daughter would you give to your parents Bill Clinton and Hillary Clinton, and why?”, to which she stated:

At the end of the event, she was crowned as Miss India World 1999 by the outgoing titleholder Annie Thomas, giving her the right to represent India at the Miss World 1999 contest.

Miss World
The 49th edition of the Miss World pageant was held on 4 December 1999 at Olympia, London and 93 delegates from around the world competed for the title. During the pageant's question and answer round, she was asked if she could be anyone in the world who would she want to be. Mookhey replied - “It would have to be Audrey Hepburn. It was her inner beauty, compassion and her aura. The calm that she had inside her reflected.”

At the end of the event, Mookhey was crowned as Miss World 1999 by her predecessor Linor Abargil from Israel. The first runner-up title was won by Martina Thorogood from Venezuela, followed by the second runner-up, Sonia Raciti of South Africa. Mookhey also won the Asia & Oceania's Queen of Beauty Award during the Miss World contest. Mookhey became the fourth woman from India to win Miss World after Reita Faria in 1966, Aishwarya Rai in 1994 and Diana Hayden in 1997.

Social works
After Mookhey's tenure as Miss World, she involved herself in various social and charitable causes. She has worked for the people affected by HIV/AIDS, breast cancer and thalassemia. Mookhey has pledged to donate her organs. In connection with this, she stated, “This step will benefit someone, once I leave this world”. She also works as an educationist and provides motivational counseling in various platforms. She partnered with an NGO to guide young girls from the slums, nudging them towards self-contemplation, understanding their needs and help them to become aware of their bodies, through counseling.

She has voiced against illegal child labour carried out in India's firecracker industries, which is an offense under the Indian law. She has also aided the people with hearing impairment, from marginalized and low-income segment of the society. She expressed - “I have spent my time learning the Indian sign language because I feel that hearing impaired people have so much latent creativity and are hampered only by their inability to communicate. I would like to help them by drawing attention to this issue.”

Mookhey is an environmental activist, and has participated in various clean drives and social movements to prevent deforestation. In 2018, she joined a campaign to prevent illegal tree cutting talking place at the Salim Ali Bird Sanctuary, to pave way for road and metro constructions. During the movement, she stated - “I don't see any reason behind constructing road and metro from the sanctuary. The metro can be constructed underground and the road can be made elsewhere. Humans are not capable of making of what ‘Mother Earth’ can do. So we are just asking to stop the works and also stop cutting the trees.” She also consigned a letter to the Pune Municipal Corporation's Heritage Cell, to include the bird sanctuary in the list of national heritage sites.

She supports the Swachh Kalyani Nagar initiative in Pune, and had campaigned the households to process their waste effectively through segregation and recycling, ensuring minimum to zero garbage generation from individual societies.

Personal life 
On 7 September 2008, Mookhey got engaged to Prince Tuli, a New York-based businessman and financial consultant at a ceremony held at the Grand Maratha in Mumbai. The marriage was held on 2 November 2008 in a traditional Sikh ceremony at a Nagpur Gurudwara followed by a reception. They have one son together. 

Her brother Kanwal Mookhey is a businessman and is married to Indian television actress Karishma Randhawa.

In July 2013, Mookhey accused her husband and in-laws of subjecting her to domestic violence and harassment, and a FIR was registered under Section 498A (cruelty and harassment) and Section 377 (unnatural sex) of the Indian Penal Code. She also accused Tuli under IPC section 377 (unnatural sex). In June 2014, the couple obtained a consensual divorce.

Career 
Mookhey entered the film industry in 2001 through the Tamil movie Poovellam Un Vasam, where she appeared in a song titled "Yukta Mookhey". She made her Hindi film debut with Pyaasa in 2002 starring with Aftab Shivdasani. The film proved to be a flop at the box office. Mookhey was cast in Market but had to drop out due to an injury. In 2003, she signed Kab Kyon Kahan and Hum Teeno, but both films where later shelved. She was later signed up in the 2004 release Insaaf: The Justice, but had to drop the project. In 2005, she acted in two films Memsahab and Love in Japan and in 2006, she appeared in the music video Kathputali.

Filmography

Films

Television

References

External links 

1970s births
21st-century Indian actresses
Sindhi people
Actresses in Hindi cinema
Actresses from Bangalore
Actresses in Bhojpuri cinema
Actresses in Tamil cinema
Beauty pageant contestants from India
Bharatiya Janata Party politicians from Maharashtra
Female models from Bangalore
Femina Miss India winners
Indian beauty pageant winners
Living people
Marital rape
Miss World 1999 delegates
Miss World winners
Violence against women in India